Giuliano Hazan (born December 1, 1958, in Manhattan, New York City) is an Italian cookbook author and educator who travels throughout the world teaching Italian cooking. He is the son of Italian cooking doyenne Marcella Hazan and wine expert Victor Hazan. His use of traditional methods and ingredients combined with modern attitudes and a straightforward recipe style have made him a popular cookbook author. His cooking schools in Italy and Florida, U.S., have been profiled in many publications. Hazan is considered to be one of the foremost authorities on Italian cooking.

Career
Although born in the United States, Hazan spent much of his childhood in Italy, and, at age 17, began assisting his mother at her School of Classic Italian Cooking in Bologna. For more than three decades, Hazan taught hands-on and demonstration-style courses at cooking schools in Europe and the United States. From 1995 to 1999, he led a number of multi-day courses at Hotel Cipriani in Venice. He has lectured at the Smithsonian Institution in Washington D.C. and the National Geographic Society. He has appeared at numerous Food and Wine Festivals including: Food & Wine Classic in Aspen, Colorado, The Masters of Food and Wine in Carmel, California, The Book and The Cook in Philadelphia, Pennsylvania, The Reading Festival in Sarasota, Florida, the Epicurean Classic in Michigan, and for 6 years he taught at Disney's Epcot International Food & Wine Festival. 

Hazan is a regular guest on the Today Show and has been a guest on the nationally syndicated PBS show, Seasonings. His school in Italy has been featured by the Fine Living network, and he is often a guest on local TV shows in cities to which he is traveling.

In 2000, Hazan and his wife, Lael, inaugurated a cooking school of their own, Cooking with Giuliano Hazan. As of 2017, they teach classes in two locations: at Villa Giona, a restored Renaissance villa outside Verona, Italy (along with partner, Marilisa Allegrini of Allegrini Winery in Valpolicella, Italy) and in Sarasota, Florida. In addition, Hazan teaches online classes through Craftsy.com. In 2013, the Verona school was named a Top 10 hotel culinary school by Fox News (2013) and one of Italy's Top Cooking Schools by Food & Wine (2015).

In 2017, Hazan started a line of Italian specialty foods called Guiliano's Classic. It includes tomato sauce based on his mother's recipe, extra-virgin olive oil and rice.

Hazan is married to food educator, Lael Hazan and is the father of Gabriella and Michela. The family lives in Sarasota, Florida.

Awards
 Winner, Gourmand World Cookbook Award, 2009
 Best Italian Cookbook in the English Language, 2000, Every Night Italian
 Winner, International Association of Culinary Professionals, 2011
 International Association of Culinary Professionals Award of Excellence, 2007 Cooking Teacher of the Year
 Best International Cookbook, 1993, The Classic Pasta Cookbook

Bibliography
 
 
 
 
 

Hazan has also contributed articles for newspapers, magazines and cookbook anthologies. These include the New York Times, Cooking Light magazine, and Cooking the Costco Way.

External links

References

American food writers
1958 births
Living people